Phosphate binders are medications used to reduce the absorption of dietary phosphate; they are taken along with meals and snacks. They are frequently used in people with chronic kidney failure (CKF), who are less able to excrete phosphate, resulting in an elevated serum phosphate.

Mechanism of action
These agents work by binding to phosphate in the GI tract, thereby making it unavailable to the body for absorption.  Hence, these drugs are usually taken with meals to bind any phosphate that may be present in the ingested food. Phosphate binders may be simple molecular entities (such as magnesium, aluminium, calcium, or lanthanum salts) that react with phosphate and form an insoluble compound. Phosphate binders such as sevelamer may also be polymeric structures which bind to phosphate and are then excreted.

Medical use
For people with chronic kidney failure, controlling serum phosphate is important because it is associated with bone pathology and regulated together with serum calcium by the parathyroid hormone (PTH).

They are also used in hypoparathyroidism which presents with hypocalcemia with hyperphosphatemia.

Adverse effects
With regard to phosphate binders, aluminium-containing compounds (such as aluminium hydroxide) are the least preferred because prolonged aluminium intake can cause encephalopathy and osteomalacia. If calcium is already being used as a supplement, additional calcium used as a phosphate binder may cause hypercalcemia and tissue-damaging calcinosis. One may avoid these adverse effects by using phosphate binders that do not contain calcium or aluminium as active ingredients, such as lanthanum carbonate or sevelamer.

Choice of agent
There have been limited trials comparing phosphate binders to placebo in the treatment of hyperphosphatemia in people with chronic kidney disease. When compared with people receiving calcium-based binders, people taking sevelamer have a reduced all-cause mortality.

Types

 Calcium acetate/magnesium carbonate

References

  Lederer E, Ouseph R, Erbeck K. Hyperphosphatemia, eMedicine.com, URL: Hyperphosphatemia: Practice Essentials, Background, Pathophysiology, Accessed on July 14, 2005.

External links
 High Phosphate Control - Official Fosrenol Homepage*
 Phosphate Binders: What Are They And How Do They Work? - American Association of Kidney Patients*
 Phosphate Binders - National Kidney Foundation
 Phosphate Binders - Northwest Kidney Centers - a center that provides services for people with ESRD in the Seattle area.
 High Phosphate - Phosphorus Control - Information for healthcare professionals on the treatment and management of hyperphosphatemia

Common Phosphate Binders
 
 Lanthanum - medlineplus.org
 Sevelamer - medlineplus.org
  Sevelamer - Renvela.com

 
Nephrology procedures